The 5th South African Infantry Brigade was an infantry brigade of the army of the Union of South Africa during World War II.  The Brigade formed part of the South African 1st Infantry Division and was formed on 13 August 1940.  It served in East Africa and the Western Desert and was disbanded on 1 January 1943.

Order of battle

East Africa
Officer Commanding: Brigadier Bertram Frank Armstrong
1st South African Irish Regiment
2nd Regiment Botha
3rd Transvaal Scottish Regiment
No. 1 S.A. Armoured Car Company
5th Field Company, SA Corps of Engineers
11th Field Ambulance, SA Medical Corps
No. 3 Mobile General Workshops, SA Technical Services Corps
1 Brigade Signals Company, SA Corps of Signals

Western Desert
The 5th Brigade was almost totally wiped out by the German 15th Panzer and Italian Ariete Divisions at Sidi Rezegh on 23 November 1941. Although receiving some replacements and being re-equipped, the Brigade never served operationally after this defeat.

Notes

Citations

Bibliography
 Agar-Hamilton, J.A.I. & Turner, L.F.C.  The Sidi Rezeg Battles: 1941.  1957, Oxford University Press, Cape Town.
 Orpen, N. East Africa and the Abyssinian Campaigns: South African Forces World War II: Volume I. 1968, Purnell, Cape Town.

Infantry brigades of South Africa in World War II
Military units and formations established in 1940
Military units and formations disestablished in 1943